The 2016 Laurie O'Reilly Cup was the ninth edition of the competition.

Australia toured New Zealand to play the Black Ferns in a two test series on 22 and 26 October. The Wallaroos played the Auckland Storm in a warm-up match at Bell Park on 18 October in Pakuranga.

The Black Ferns thrashed Australia in the first test, which was a double header with the All Blacks and Wallabies, 67–3 at Eden Park. The Wallaroos improved in the second test in North Harbour, but it still wasn't enough, as the Black Ferns retained the Laurie O'Reilly trophy and won the series.

Table

Results

Game 1 

Notes:

 Ivy Kaleta, Hana Ngaha, Vesinia Schaaf-Tatufa, Shontelle Stowers, Nareta Marsters, Sarah Riordan, Alanna Patison, Emily Robinson, Kirby Sefo, Ariana Kaiwai and Katrina Barker made their international debuts for Australia.
 Aotearoa Mata’u and Kristina Sue of New Zealand made their international debuts.
 Rebecca Clough was ruled out with a leg injury she sustained in the warm up match against Auckland Storm.

Game 2 

Notes:

 Pip Love suffered an ACL injuryin the first Test bringing her season to an end.
 Grace Hamilton made her run-on debut.

Squads

Australia 
Head Coach Paul Verrell named a 26-player squad. Oneata Schwalger and Victoria Latu, were late withdrawals from the squad due to injury and were replaced by Danielle Meskell and Grace Hamilton. Michelle Bailey was called up into the squad.

*Uncapped Players

New Zealand 
Head Coach Glenn Moore named a 28-player squad.

*Uncapped Players

References 

Australia women's national rugby union team
New Zealand women's national rugby union team
Laurie O'Reilly Cup
Laurie O'Reilly Cup